Software package may refer to:

 Package (package management system), in which individual files or resources are packed together as a software collection that provides certain functionality as part of a larger system
 Software suite, which provides an organized collection of multiple packages, or a package consisting of multiple separate pieces

See also 
 Package (disambiguation)
 Packager (disambiguation)
 Packaging (disambiguation)
 Packaged (disambiguation)